This list includes the Swedish footballers who played at least one match for the Sweden senior national football team, and are born outside Sweden. Some of them are naturalized while others (like Tobias Linderoth and Jordan Larsson) are born outside the northern country while their father was playing in another country.

List of players

Azerbaijan 

Jiloan Hamad 2011–18

Bosnia and Herzegovina 

Anel Ahmedhodžić 2020
Nordin Gerzić 2011
 Branimir Hrgota 2014

Eritrea 

 Tesfaldet Tekie 2019–

Ethiopia 

 Benjamin Kibebe 2001

Finland 

 Gary Sundgren 1994–2000

France 

 Tobias Linderoth 1999–2008

Iran 
 Behrang Safari 2008–13

Italy 
 Riccardo Gagliolo 2019–

Kosovo 

 Emir Bajrami 2010–12
 Erton Fejzullahu 2013–14

Lebanon 

 George Mourad 2005
 Sharbel Touma 2001–04

Montenegro 

 Emir Kujović 2016

Netherlands 

 Jordan Larsson 2018–
Niclas Kindvall 1992-1994

Togo 

 Pascal Simpson 1997

Turkey 

 Erkan Zengin 2013–16

Uruguay 

 Guillermo Molins 2010–14

USA 

 Eddie Gustafsson 2000–10
 Frank Jacobsson 1951–53
 Karl-Alfred Jacobsson 1952–54

By country of birth

References 

Lists of Sweden international footballers
Sweden
Immigration to Sweden
Association football player non-biographical articles
Sweden